Valliammal Matriculation Higher Secondary School is a school in Anna Nagar, Chennai, India. It was founded in 1968 by A.M. Paramasivanandam. The school is run by the Valliammal Educational Trust.

Awards and rankings 
Valliammal is a Tier-A school, according to EduRaft's ranking system. In a function held in New Delhi in November 2011, Valliammal was awarded an International School Award by the British Council of India.

Events
The 44th annual school sports meet was held in September 2013.

References

External links
About the school by Digital Campus.

High schools and secondary schools in Chennai
Educational institutions established in 1968
1968 establishments in Madras State